Avonmouth Docks railway station was in the Avonmouth district of Bristol. It was opened by the Great Western Railway on 9 May 1910 as a terminus for trains on the Henbury Loop Line. The last train to the station ran on 22 March 1915, after which it was closed as a wartime economy measure. It officially closed on 28 April 1919.

References

See also 
 Avonmouth railway station (disambiguation)

Disused railway stations in Bristol
Railway stations in Great Britain opened in 1910
Railway stations in Great Britain closed in 1919
Former Great Western Railway stations
Avonmouth